Stenocercus azureus is a species of lizard of the Tropiduridae family. It is found in Uruguay, Brazil, and Argentina.

References

Stenocercus
Reptiles described in 1880